Longing for the Sea (Swedish: Längtan till havet) is a 1931 French-Swedish drama film directed by John W. Brunius and starring Edvin Adolphson, Carl Barcklind and Inga Tidblad. It is the Swedish-language version of the French film Marius directed by Alexander Korda and based on the 1929 play play of the same title by Marcel Pagnol. It was shot at the Joinville Studios in Paris and on location in Marseilles. The film's sets were designed by the art director Vincent Korda.

Synopsis
Marius works in his father's cafe on the Marseille waterfront but dreams of going away to sea. He has a dalliance with Fanny, but ultimately leaves her to take a job as a sailor on a ship sailing the world.

Cast
 Edvin Adolphson as 	Marius
 Carl Barcklind as 	Marius's father
 Inga Tidblad as 	Fanny
 Karin Swanström as 	Fanny's mother
 Rune Carlsten as 	Panisse
 Nils Lundell as Piquoiseau
 Georg Blomstedt as Felix Escartefique
 John W. Brunius as Le Goelec
 Nils Jacobsson as 	Sailor
 Nils Wahlbom as Brun

References

Bibliography 
 Goble, Alan. The Complete Index to Literary Sources in Film. Walter de Gruyter, 1999.
 Sadoul, Georges. Dictionary of Film Makers. University of California Press, 1972.

External links 
 

1931 films
French drama films
Swedish drama films
1931 drama films
1930s Swedish-language films
Films directed by John W. Brunius
Swedish black-and-white films
Swedish films based on plays
Films set in Marseille
Films shot in Marseille
Films shot at Joinville Studios
Paramount Pictures films
Films based on works by Marcel Pagnol
1930s Swedish films
1930s French films